Kot Karar Khan  is a village in Kapurthala district of Punjab State, India. The village is administrated by a Sarpanch who is an elected representative of village.

Demography 
According to the report published by Census India in 2011, Kot Karar Khan has 367 households with a total population of 1,858 persons, of which 954 were male and 904 female. The literacy rate of was 75.62%, lower than the state average of 75.84%.  The population of children in the age group 0–6 years was 213 which was 11.46% of the total population.  Child sex ratio was approximately 936, higher than the state average of 846.

Population data

References

External links 
  Villages in Kapurthala
 Kapurthala Villages List

Villages in Kapurthala district